Astracantha is a genus of phaeodaria containing the sole species of plankton A. heteracantha. It was first described by the zoologist Valentin Haecker in 1908. It is the only member of the family Astracanthidae, described by Ernst Haeckel in 1887.

This genus is characterized by a skeleton or theca comprised by 30 to 40 hollow spines radiating from the central focal point. Midway along each spine there are numerous short, irregularly spaced, outwardly curved branches that bear terminal thorns proximally (i.e. closer to the cell), but become terminally (i.e. further from the cell) smooth-pointed and slightly thicker. The length of their radial tubes is around 1.8 millimeters.

References

Phaeodaria